Dungannon Lower (named after Dungannon town) is a historic barony in County Tyrone, Northern Ireland. It was created in 1851 with the splitting of the barony of Dungannon. It is bordered by four other baronies in Northern Ireland: Dungannon Middle to the north; Tiranny to the south-east; Clogher to the west; and Omagh East to the north-west. It is also bordered in the south-west by the barony of Trough in the Republic of Ireland.

List of main settlements
Aughnacloy
Caledon

List of civil parishes
Below is a list of civil parishes in Dungannon Lower:
Aghaloo
Carnteel
Clonfeacle (split with Dungannon Middle, Armagh and Oneilland West)
Killeeshil

References

 
1851 establishments in Ireland